Arabian Nights comics are comic book stories adapted and inspired by the One Thousand and One Nights. The collection of Middle Eastern folk tales has inspired filmmakers (The Thief of Baghdad, all the various versions of Sindbad, Aladdin, etc.), playwrights (Edward Knoblock's Kismet, James Elroy Flecker's Hassan) and popular novelists (John Barth, A. S. Byatt – even Nobel Prize-winner Naguib Mahfouz), and comics versions proliferate as well. Generally, the comic adaptations are meant to bring classic literature and mythology to a younger audience.

Synopsis
The story is a frame narrative, told by Scheherazade. Shahryar, the Persian Sassanid King of kings, was infamous for beheading his wives due to his suspicions of faithlessness. After running out of women to marry and behead, the King goes to his vizier, who reluctantly offers his daughter, Scheherazade. She uses her dazzling tales to keep the interest of the King as the night begins until the day comes, so that she will not be beheaded overnight. Eventually, because of her tales, the King decides to spare her.

Comic book adaptations 
 Classics Illustrated #8 (1947) — abridged version of One Thousand and One Nights in comic book form. This version of the tales, illustrated by Lillian Chestney, consists of "Ali Baba and the Forty Thieves," "The Story of the Magic Horse," The Adventures of Sinbad the Sailor," and "Aladdin and His Magic Lamp" (which are all a part of the traditional One Thousand and One Nights). Although abridged, the comic adaptation of the tales remains faithful to the original tales, although the origins are not clear-cut.
 Carl Barks, the creator of Scrooge McDuck, wrote two substantial adventure stories based on the Nights: 
 "In The Cave of Ali Baba", a fascinating tale-within-a-tale framed by some magicians performing the Indian rope trick.
 "Rug Riders in the Sky", The second of Barks' classic Uncle Scrooge Arabian Nights adventures. somewhat more perfunctory, a fantasia based on the flying carpet motif made familiar thanks to Douglas Fairbanks. Barks is clearly fascinated by the Roc, that elephant-sized bird in the old stories, but beyond that archaeology sets his pulse racing more than folklore and narratology.
 "Desert Shadows," Wet Dreams (Heavy Metal, 2000), by Alfonso Azpiri — the association of the Nights with pornography clearly dies hard, as the cover illustration to this anthology of vaguely mythological short stories reveals.
 "Ramadan," The Sandman #50 (DC Vertigo, June 1993), by Neil Gaiman (story) and P. Craig Russell (art) — the highest-selling issue in the whole run of Gaiman's The Sandman series. Produced in 1992, it ends with images from the Gulf War.
 One Thousand and One Nights by Jeon Jin Seok (story) and Han Seughee (art) — a truly bizarre manhwa rewriting of the Nights for female Korean teenagers. A lot of stress on gay sex & incest (retellings of the story of Cleopatra – in love with her brother rather than either Julius Caesar or Mark Antony – & Socrates and Alcibiades, among others) makes it rather more "revisionist" than perhaps its original publishers intended. As a result, the English translations lag a couple of years behind the Korean version. Published in six volumes, all translated by Hye Young Im & J. Torres:
 One Thousand and One Nights Vol 1. 2004. Seoul: Ice-Kunion, 2005.
 One Thousand and One Nights Vol 2. 2005. Seoul: Ice-Kunion, 2006.
 One Thousand and One Nights Vol 3. 2005. Seoul: Ice-Kunion, 2006.
 One Thousand and One Nights Vol 4. 2005. New York: Yen Press, 2008.
 One Thousand and One Nights Vol 5. 2006. New York: Yen Press, 2008.
 One Thousand and One Nights Vol 6. 2006. New York: Yen Press, 2008.
 Les 1001 nuits de Scheherazade. Paris: Albin Michel, 2001, by Eric Maltaite — straightforward — though sexually explicit — retelling of the first few stories from the collection.

Arabian Nights games 
 Arabian Nights: Magic and Mystery in the Land of the Djinn by Phil Masters. Edited by Steve Jackson and Susan Pinsonneault. (Austin, Tx: Steve Jackson Games, 1993) — probably for fans of Dungeons & Dragons-style games only. Extremely circumstantial and detailed.
 The Chess Mysteries of the Arabian Knights, by Raymond Smullyan. 1981. (Oxford: Oxford UP, 1992) — somewhat eccentric adaptation of Arabian Nights scenarios to the exigencies of the chessboard.

References

1947 comics debuts
Works based on One Thousand and One Nights
Comics based on fairy tales
Comics set in the Middle East
Comics set in deserts